Attic Gold is a television series airing on the DIY Network. The show follows Eric Myers and his family-owned business Junk, Junk, Baby! out of Ipswich, Massachusetts, which offers "clean-outs" of any attic or other space free of charge, but just as long as they can recycle, re-purpose and re-sell any valuables they find in the process. After the job is done, they turn the attic into a usable room for their clients. The show airs on Sunday nights at 9:00 p.m. EST

Premise
Opening Introduction:

Crew
Eric Myers - Boss & Brains 
Michelle Myers - Appraiser  
Dennis "The Bull" - Heavy Lifter & Smasher 
Leeland "No Bones" Jones - The Muscle

References

External links

Junk, Junk, Baby!

2015 American television series debuts
2010s American reality television series
2015 American television series endings